Kagam is a village in Vizianagaram district of the Indian state of Andhra Pradesh. It is located in Therlam mandal.

References

Villages in Vizianagaram district